Thepytus  is a Neotropical genus of butterflies in the family Lycaenidae.

Species
Thepytus epytus (Godman & Salvin, [1887])
Thepytus thyrea (Hewitson, 1867)
Thepytus arindela (Hewitson, 1874)
Thepytus echelta (Hewitson, 1867)

References

External links
Images representing Thepytus at EOL
Images representing Theptyus at Consortium for the Barcode of Life

Eumaeini
Lycaenidae of South America
Lycaenidae genera